Events from the year 1960 in Pakistan.

Incumbents

Federal government
President: Ayub Khan
Chief Justice: 
 until 2 May: Muhammad Munir 
 3–12 May: Muhammad Shahabuddin
 starting 13 May: A.R. Cornelius

Events

May 
 11 May 1960, the No. 8 Squadron of PAF famously known as Haiders is raised at PAF Base Masroor.

September
 24 February, The name of Islamabad is decided by the Presidential Cabinet of Pakistan for the new capital
 Early September, irregular Royal Afghan Forces on the command of Daoud Khan invade Pakistan's Bajaur District in an attempt to annexe the region thus starting the Bajaur Campaign. They are ultimately pushed back by Pakistani forces and Pakistani Pashtun tribesmen.
 19 September, Pakistan and the Republic of India sign the Indus Waters Treaty.

See also
 1959 in Pakistan
 1961 in Pakistan
 List of Pakistani films of 1960
 Timeline of Pakistani history

 
1960 in Asia